Discovery Ridge is an organized hamlet within the Rural Municipality (RM) of Corman Park No. 344 in the Canadian province of Saskatchewan.

Government 
While Discovery Ridge is under the jurisdiction of the RM of Corman Park No. 344, it has a three-person hamlet board that is chaired by Ed Underwood.

References 

 

Corman Park No. 344, Saskatchewan
Division No. 11, Saskatchewan
Organized hamlets in Saskatchewan